Stanisław Kogut (29 October 1953 – 18 October 2020) was a Polish politician who was a member of the Polish Senate from 2005 to 2019 as a member of the Law and Justice party. 

He died from COVID-19 during the COVID-19 pandemic in Poland, eleven days short from his 67th birthday.

References

External links
 http://www.stanislawkogut.bo.pl/ 

1959 births
2020 deaths
People from Nowy Sącz County
Law and Justice politicians
Members of the Senate of Poland 2005–2007
Members of the Senate of Poland 2007–2011
Members of the Senate of Poland 2011–2015
Members of the Senate of Poland 2015–2019
Polish trade unionists
Deaths from the COVID-19 pandemic in Poland